The Geisenheim Grape Breeding Institute was founded in 1872 and is located in the town of Geisenheim, in Germany's Rheingau region. In 1876 Swiss-born professor Hermann Müller joined the institute, where he developed his namesake grape variety Müller-Thurgau, which became Germany's most-planted grape variety in the 1970s. Professor Helmut Becker worked at the institute from 1964 until his death in 1989.

Academic Grade
Geisenheim is the only German institution to award higher academic degrees in winemaking. Formally, undergraduate level viticulture and enology, ending with a bachelor's degree in engineering is awarded by the University of Applied Sciences in Wiesbaden, and the newly introduced master's degree is awarded by the Giessen University.

Breeds
 White: Müller-Thurgau, Arnsburger, Ehrenfelser, Saphira, Reichensteiner, Ehrenbreitsteiner, Prinzipal, Osteiner, Witberger, Schönburger, Primera, Rabaner, Hibernal
 Red: Rotberger, Dakapo
 Improvements: Rondo, Orléans, Dunkelfelder

See also
 Wine
 German wine
 Geilweilerhof Institute for Grape Breeding

References

External links
 DEPARTMENT OF GRAPEVINE BREEDING at Geisenheim University

1872 establishments in Germany
Wine industry organizations
Oenology
Organizations established in 1872
Agricultural research institutes in Germany
Rheingau
Yeast banks